Qasr al-Basha, also known as Pasha's Palace Museum, Radwan Castle, and Napoleon's Fort, is a historical palace situated in the Old City of Gaza, now housing a museum and a girls' school. It served as a seat of power in the Mamluk and Ottoman periods and as a police station under the British Mandate.

History

Mamluk period
The first floor of Qasr al-Basha was built by the Mamluk sultan Zahir Baibars in the mid-13th century. The façade bares the landmark of Baibars which is a relief sculpture of two lions facing each other. The geometrical patterns and domes, fan and cross vaults are typical Mamluk architecture under Bahri rule. According to local legend, in the 13th century CE, when Baibars was still general fighting the Crusaders and Mongols throughout the Levant, he passed through Gaza on several occasions. During one of his visits, Baibars is believed to have married in Gaza and built a grand mansion for his Gazan wife and children. It is said that Qasr al-Basha is what remains of this home.

Ottoman period
The second floor of the building is largely of Ottoman-era construction. In the 17th century, Qasr al-Basha served as the fortress home of the ruling Radwan dynasty (hence the name "Radwan Castle") and later pashas of Gaza, who were governors appointed by the Ottoman governor of the Damascus Province. During this era, the fortress was provided with arrow slits and underground passages as means of defense. Within the complex were soldier's lodgings, a mosque, granary, an armory, and cannons. The height of the structure made Qasr al-Basha a strategic point in Gaza. This, along with its fortifications, was the probable reason Napoleon Bonaparte spent three nights at the palace during his campaign that ended at Acre in 1799, hence the name "Napoleon's Fort". 

Turkish traveller Evliya Çelebi wrote of Qasr al-Basha in 1649, saying "the Citadel was built in ancient times and destroyed by Nebuchadnezzar. The present citadel derives from a later time. It is small and rectangular and lies one hour distant, east of the sea. Its walls are twenty yards high. It has a metal door which opens in the direction of the qibla. The commander and the garrison must always be present here to fulfill their guard duties because it is in a dangerous place, here the Arab tribes and the enemy are numerous."

Modern period
During the British Mandate of Palestine period it was used as a police station, and during the United Arab Republican rule of Gaza, Qasr al-Basha was turned into a school known as the Princess Ferial School for Girls. After Farouk I of Egypt were deposed in Cairo, the school was renamed to al-Zahra Secondary School for Girls. 

The United Nations Development Programme (UNDP) undertook a project, funded by a grant from the German Development Bank (KfW), for the transformation of Qasr al-Basha into a museum. The UNDP built new facilities for the girls school, and restoration of the Pasha's Palace began under the close supervision of the Palestinian Authority Department of Antiquities and Cultural Heritage. During the first phase of the project, workers landscaped the museum grounds, installed new doors, windows and gates, and restored the facade of the palace. 

In the second phase of the project, display cases and other appropriate furniture was installed in the museum. The Department of Antiquities used them to exhibit some items from their collection, including Neolithic, Ancient Egyptian, Phoenician, Persian, Hellenistic, and Roman artifacts. The smaller building in front of the palace was also renovated for use as a gateway to the museum.

See also 
 List of museums in the State of Palestine
 Ahmad ibn Ridwan
 Husayn Pasha
 Musa Pasha ibn Hasan Ridwan

References

Buildings and structures completed in the 13th century
Mamluk architecture in the State of Palestine
Buildings and structures in Gaza City
Museums in the Gaza Strip
Palaces in the Gaza Strip
Schools in the Gaza Strip